"Now That You're Gone" is a song written and recorded by American singer-songwriter Sheryl Crow. It was released as the third single from Crow's sixth studio album Detours in the United Kingdom. 

The song was ranked the 97th best song of the year 2008 by Rolling Stone, who describe the song as having "(all) the sassy independence of Kelly Clarkson's 'Since U Been Gone,' except 20 years wiser. With bluesy swagger, Crow has mastered the art of writing breakup anthems for grown-ups..."

References

2008 singles
Sheryl Crow songs
Songs written by Sheryl Crow
Song recordings produced by Bill Bottrell
2008 songs